The 12531 / 12532 Gorakhpur–Lucknow Intercity Sf Express is a Superfast train belonging to Indian Railways North Eastern Railway zone that runs between  and  in India via  and .

It operates as train number 12531 from Gorakhpur Junction to Lucknow Junction and as train number 12532 in the reverse direction, serving the state of Uttar Pradesh.

Coaches
The 12531 / 12532 Gorakhpur Junction–Lucknow Junction Intercity Sf Express has 5 AC Chair Car,  10 Non-AC chair car, 6 general unreserved & 2 Generator cars. It does not carry a pantry car.

As is customary with most train services in India, coach composition may be amended at the discretion of Indian Railways depending on demand. It has been LHB-fied by Northern Eastern Railway on 28 March 2019 to enhance safety, speed, reliability & comfortable journey. After revised structure it gets 2 generator cum luggage car, 10 non AC chair car, 5 AC chair car, 5 general unreserved class.

Service

Routing
The 12531 / 12532 Gorakhpur–Lucknow Intercity Sf Express runs from Gorakhpur Junction via ,

Traction
As the route is fully electrified, a Ghaziabad / Kanpur-based WAP-7 (HOG)-equipped locomotive pulls the train to its destination.

References

External links
12531 Intercity Express at India Rail Info
12532 Intercity Express at India Rail Info

Intercity Express (Indian Railways) trains
Passenger trains originating from Gorakhpur
Passenger trains originating from Lucknow